Metropolitan Hilarion (born Igor Alexeyevich Kapral, ; 6 January 1948 – 16 May 2022) was a bishop of the Russian Orthodox Church Outside Russia (ROCOR), Metropolitan of Eastern America and New York, First-Hierarch of the ROCOR since 18 May 2008; as the first person elected to that position following the Act of Canonical Communion between the ROCOR and the Russian Orthodox Church, he was the first whose election required approval by the Holy Synod of the Moscow Patriarchate.

On 17 May 2007, upon the signing of the Act of Canonical Communion between the ROCOR and the Russian Orthodox Church (Moscow Patriarchate), Kapral became a part of the episcopate of the Moscow Patriarchate.

Biography

Early years 
The youngest child of Alexei and Euphrosynia Kapral, Ukrainian immigrants, Igor Kapral was born on 6 January 1948 in Spirit River, Alberta, Canada. He spoke Ukrainian at home and English at school. He spent a childhood he described as having been "pleasant ... absolutely free of any harmful influences", walking two and a half miles to school each day. (Later, Kapral transferred to a school in Blueberry Creek, but he returned to finish high school.)

From his youth, Kapral felt drawn to the Church and loved to read books and periodicals on religion and morals. From a young age, around 6 or 7, he knew that he wanted to become a priest. He attended Holy Trinity Church in Spirit River, a congregation of the ROCOR composed of ethnic Ukrainians. Services were held monthly or bi-monthly, and often Archbishop Panteleimon (Rudyk) would celebrate these services. Igor revered Archbishop Panteleimon, who told the boy, "someday you will be a priest".

Seminary, priesthood 
In 1966, Kapral found a spiritual guide: Right Reverend Sava (Saračević), Bishop of Edmonton, a Serb who greatly revered John of Shanghai and San Francisco. In 1967, Kapral entered Holy Trinity Orthodox Seminary in Jordanville, New York. While there, he learned the Russian language, sang on the kliros, and served in the altar, learning the order of divine services. From his second year at seminary, Kapral was tasked with typesetting "Orthodox Life" in English, under the editorship of archimandrite Constantine Zaitsev; Igor soon succeeded him as editor. After some time, hieromonk Ignatius (Trepatschko), who was in charge of printing the journal, asked Kapral to typeset it in Russian as well.

Upon graduation from the seminary in 1972, Kapral entered the Holy Trinity Monastery as a novice. On 2 December 1974, he was tonsured a rassophore monk with the name Hilarion, in honor of Venerable Schema-monk Hilarion of the Kiev Caves and subsequently was tonsured into the little schema. On 4 December 1975, Archbishop Averky Taushev, for whom Hilarion served as a cell-attendant, ordained him a hierodeacon and on Lazarus Saturday 1976 Bishop Laurus of Manhattan ordained him a hieromonk. Hilarion served as a hieromonk at the monastery, continuing his work at the printing press. He was often sent to parishes, replacing absent priests, often traveling to Cleveland and Pennsylvania.

Bishop 

On 10 December 1984, Hilarion was consecrated a bishop by Metropolitan of New York Philaret and nine other bishops and appointed to the see of Manhattan, charged with overseeing parishes in Pennsylvania; in the Synod of Bishops, Hilarion served as deputy secretary. In 1995, Bishop Hilarion was transferred to the See of Washington while retaining his residence in New York City. On 20 June 1996, he was transferred to the Diocese of Australia and New Zealand (which was experiencing problems at that stage) and raised to the rank of archbishop.

In December 2003, the Council of Bishops of the ROCOR awarded him the honour of wearing a diamond cross on his klobuk.

In May 2006, the Council of Bishops of the ROCOR appointed him Chief Deputy of the President of the Synod of Bishops with residence in New York.

First-Hierarch of the ROCOR 
On 12 May 2008, Archbishop Hilarion was elected and elevated as the new First-hierarch of the ROCOR, having received 9 votes out of 11. On 14 May of that year, he was approved by the Holy Synod of the Moscow Patriarchate to the post of the primate and elevated to the rank of metropolitan. On 18 May, he was enthroned in New York City. On 10 December 2008, he was appointed a member of the Preparatory Commission for the Local Council of the Russian Orthodox Church.

On the first day of the 2022 Russian invasion of Ukraine, Hilarion, an ethnic Ukrainian who spoke Ukrainian at home as a child, issued an "Epistle to the Clergy and Flock ... on Great Lent and on the Events on the Holy Ukrainian Land" commencing:
As we approach Great Lent, this salvific time of profound prayer and self-correction, and in connection with the events in the Ukrainian land, I turn to all with a heartfelt plea: to refrain from excessive watching television, following newspapers and the internet, to close our hearts to the passions ignited by mass media, while doubling our fervent prayers for peace throughout the world, for overcoming enmity and discord, for help for the suffering, for the repose of those who have departed into the eternal life and the consolation of their friends and relatives, so that we all first and foremost remain humane and Orthodox Christians in these difficult times.

Death
On 16 May 2022, Metropolitan Hilarion died in a New York City hospital, following a lengthy period of ill health. He was 74. He is buried in the monastic brotherhood cemetery behind Holy Trinity Cathedral in Jordanville, NY.

References

Sources

 Biography
 Biography at Moscow Patriarchate official site 
 Archbishop Hilarion of Sydney elected ROCOR head
 Anniversary of the enthronement of met. Hilarion, Russian Church Abroad. His enthronement speech
 http://www.russianorthodoxchurch.ws/synod/eng2008/5enizbrany.html
 http://www.synod.com/synod/engdocuments/enart_mhinterviewpriesthood.html
 http://synod.com/english/pages/legacy/hillarioninterview.html

1948 births
2022 deaths
First Hierarchs of the Russian Orthodox Church Outside Russia
Eastern Orthodoxy in Australia
Canadian Eastern Orthodox bishops
Canadian people of Ukrainian descent
People from the Municipal District of Spirit River No. 133
20th-century Eastern Orthodox archbishops
21st-century Eastern Orthodox archbishops
Recipients of the Centenary Medal